The Men's giant slalom competition at the 2015 World Championships was held on February 13.
Ted Ligety won his third consecutive world title.

A qualification was held a day earlier.

Results
The first run was started at 10:15 and the second run at 14:15.

References

Men's giant slalom